Wang Fan (born 8 March 1987), former name Fan Dongqing is a Chinese footballer.

Club career
Wang Fan(Fan Dongqing) started his professional football career in 2007 when he joined Chongqing Lifan for the 2007 China League One campaign. 
In March 2014, Wang transferred to China League Two side Lijiang Jiayunhao.

On 13 July 2015, Wang transferred to China League One side Guizhou Zhicheng.

Career statistics 
Statistics accurate as of match played 31 December 2020.

References

External links
 

1987 births
Living people
Chinese footballers
Footballers from Chongqing
Chongqing Liangjiang Athletic F.C. players
Yunnan Flying Tigers F.C. players
Guizhou F.C. players
Chinese Super League players
China League One players
China League Two players
Association football midfielders